is a Japanese regional bank headquartered in Shizuoka, Shizuoka Prefecture. One of the largest regional banks in Japan, it has over 190 domestic branches, primarily concentrated in the Tokai region between Tokyo and Osaka and overseas offices in Los Angeles, New York, Brussels, Hong Kong, Shanghai, and Singapore.

History
It has been listed on the Tokyo Stock Exchange since October 1961. The Shizuoka Bank maintains strong ties to the Mitsubishi UFJ Financial Group through joint venture subsidiaries for credit cards and stock brokerage. Its New York branch was located in the New York World Trade Center at the time of the September 11, 2001, attacks, but none of its employees were killed.

In 2002, Shizuoka Bank was praised by rating agency Fitch, which noted its "overall performance and strength indicators are superior to any of the major Japanese banks."

References

External links

Official home page
Google Finance
Hoovers Report

Companies based in Shizuoka Prefecture
Banks established in 1943
Regional banks of Japan
Companies listed on the Tokyo Stock Exchange
Japanese companies established in 1943
Shizuoka (city)